The Niles Blues were a minor league baseball team based in Niles, Michigan. In 1910, the Blues played their only season as charter members of the short–lived Class D level Indiana-Michigan League, hosting home games at LaPierre Park.

History
Niles, Michigan first hosted minor league baseball play in 1910. The Niles Blues became charter members of the short–lived 1910 Class D level Indiana-Michigan League, which formed as a six–team league. The league played games only on Sunday. The Berrien Springs Grays, Dowagiac, Michigan team, Elkhart Blue Sox, Gary Sand Fleas and Ligonier, Indiana team joined the Niles Blues as charter members in league play.

The Niles' use of the "Blues" moniker corresponded to their navy blue uniforms.

The 1910 Niles Blues were owned and managed by Fred "Bunny" Marshall. In 1910, Marshall also built the Blues' home ballpark, LaPierre Park. Marhsall was the owner of the local New Niles Bottling Works. It was noted that Marshall enjoyed gambling, fun and outsmarting anyone who tried to outwit him. Reportedly, players named Claffy and Connory played for the Blues, George Fink was reported to have played outfield and Lyle Hasfelt played third base for the Blues, while Marshall's son "Bunny Jr." served as the team mascot.

Reportedly, Marshall hired Guy Morton to pitch a game for Niles when the team was without a pitcher. Allegedly, Marshall had Morton sit in the stands, took bets and then put Morton in to pitch, winning the game.

The 1910 Niles Blues began play on May 8, 1910 and placed 3rd in the Indiana–Michigan League standings in a shortened season. After the Gary franchise folded on June 19, 1910 and Ligonier folded on June 30, 1910, the league continued play as a four–team league. The league then folded on August 21, 1910.

When the Indiana–Michigan League permanently folded on August 21, 1910, the Niles Blues were in 3rd place with a 8–10 record, playing under manager Fred Marhsall. Niles finished 6.5 games behind 1st place Berrien Springs in the final overall standings. The final Indiana–Michigan League overall standings were led by the Berrien Springs Grays (15–4), followed by the Elkhart Blue Sox (10–8), Niles Blues (8–10) and Dowagiac (7–10). The Gary Sand Fleas had a record of 2–5 when they folded and Ligonier had a 2–6 final record in their brief period of play. The Indiana–Michigan League never reformed.

Niles, Michigan has not hosted another minor league team.

The ballpark
The Niles Grays hosted 1910 minor league home games at LaPierre Park. The ballpark was built in 1910 by Fred Marshall, the owner and manager of the Niles Blues. The ballpark was also known as Springbrook Park and League Park. It was reported to have been located near the railroad tracks on Wayne Street between 7th street and 8th Street, Niles, Michigan.

Year–by–year record

Notable alumni
Guy Morton (1910)
The player rosters and statistics for the 1910 Indiana-Michigan League teams, Niles included, is unknown.

References

External links
Baseball Reference

Defunct minor league baseball teams
Professional baseball teams in Michigan
Defunct baseball teams in Michigan
Baseball teams established in 1910
Baseball teams disestablished in 1910
Niles, Michigan